The discography of Japanese group KinKi Kids consists of 16 studio albums, 6 compilation albums, 25 video albums and 44 singles. All of KinKi Kids' singles have reached number one in Japan on Oricon charts. All of their music has been released by Johnny's Entertainment in Japan. In Taiwan, Kinki Kids' music has been released under Forward Music from 1997 to 2000, Skyhigh Entertainment and What's Music in 2001, and Avex Taiwan from 2002 to the present.

Studio albums

Compilation albums

Singles

Promotional singles

Video albums

Notes

References

Discographies of Japanese artists
Pop music discographies